St John's Place (formerly known as Kirkside) is an ancient street in the city of Perth, Scotland, located a short distance southeast of the city centre. The latter construction also saw the loss of the short-lived St John's Square, which was created in the 1960s. There is also a South St John Street, while North St John Street (formerly College Yard) existed in the early 20th century.

The street was established in at least the 12th century, prior to being given its current name, which is derived from St John's Kirk. The church, which stands at the junction of St John's Place and St John Street, is a Category A listed structure. It was completed around 1448, replacing another church dating to 1126.

Antique dealers Thomas Love & Sons (1869–2009) occupied 12–19 St John’s Place between the late 19th century and 1960. In 1898, it connected its two warehouses with an overbridge.

Listed buildings in St John's Place 

 St John's Kirk (Category A)
 3 St John's Place (Category B)
 5–8 St John's Place (Category C)
 9 and 10 St John's Place (Category B)

Vennels 

The below vennels begin or end on St John's Place.

 Baxters Vennel (St John's Place to Watergate) – Baxter is the old Scots name for baker
 Fleshers' Vennel (St John's Place to 49 South Street)
 Salt Vennel – one of the Kirk vennels
 School Vennel

References 

Streets in Perth, Scotland
12th-century establishments in Scotland